The 2003 FIFA Confederations Cup football tournament was the sixth FIFA Confederations Cup, held in France in June 2003. France retained the title they had won in 2001, but the tournament was overshadowed by the death of Cameroon player Marc-Vivien Foé, who died of heart failure in his side's semi-final against Colombia. Foé's death united the France and Cameroon teams in the final match, which was played even though team players from both sides had explicitly stated that the match should not be played out of respect for Foé. France went on to win the trophy with a golden goal from Thierry Henry.

At the presentation of medals and trophies, two Cameroon players held a gigantic photo of Foé, and a runner-up medal was hung to the edge of the photo. When French captain Marcel Desailly was presented with the Confederations Cup, he did not lift it up high, but held it in unison with Cameroon captain Rigobert Song. Foé finished third in media voting for player of the tournament and was posthumously awarded the Bronze Ball at its conclusion.

Qualified teams

1Italy, the UEFA Euro 2000 runners-up, declined to take part as did Germany, the 2002 FIFA World Cup runners-up. So did Spain, who were ranked second in the FIFA World Rankings at the time. They were replaced by Turkey, who came third in the 2002 FIFA World Cup.

Bid process
Five bids came before the deadline at 1 May 2002. Australia, Portugal and the United States put in single bids, while South Africa–Egypt and France–Switzerland put in joint bids. The France–Switzerland bid never materialized.

The host was selected on 24 September 2002, during a meeting of the FIFA Executive Committee.

Venues
The matches were played in:

Match officials

Africa
Coffi Codjia (Benin)
Asia
Masoud Moradi (Iran)
Europe
Lucílio Batista (Portugal)
Valentin Ivanov (Russia)
Markus Merk (Germany)

North America, Central America and Caribbean
Carlos Batres (Guatemala)
Oceania
Mark Shield (Australia)
South America
Carlos Amarilla (Paraguay)
Jorge Larrionda (Uruguayan)

Squads

Group stage

Group A

Group B

Knockout stage

Semi-finals

Third place play-off

Final

Awards

Golden Ball
The Golden Ball award is given to the tournament's best player, as voted by the media.

Golden Shoe
The Golden Shoe award is given to the tournament's top goalscorer.

FIFA Fair Play Award
FIFA presents the Fair Play Award to the team with the best fair play record, according to a points system and criteria established by the FIFA Fair Play Committee.

Statistics

Goalscorers
Thierry Henry received the Golden Shoe award for scoring four goals. In total, 37 goals were scored by 22 different players, with none of them credited as own goal.

4 goals
 Thierry Henry

3 goals

 Giovanni Hernández
 Robert Pires
 Shunsuke Nakamura
 Tuncay Şanlı
 Okan Yılmaz

2 goals

 Adriano
 Gökdeniz Karadeniz

1 goal

 Alex
 Samuel Eto'o
 Geremi
 Pius Ndiefi
 Jorge López
 Mario Yepes
 Djibril Cissé
 Ludovic Giuly
 Sidney Govou
 Olivier Kapo
 Sylvain Wiltord
 Hidetoshi Nakata
 Raf de Gregorio
 DaMarcus Beasley

Tournament ranking

References

External links

FIFA Confederations Cup France 2003, FIFA.com
2003 FIFA Confederations Cup Official Site (Archived)
 FIFA Technical Report (Part 1), (Part 2) and (Part 3) (Archived)
 FIFA Confederations Cup France 2003 Regulations

 
2003
2003
2002–03 in French football
2002–03 in Turkish football
2003 in Japanese football
Brazil at the 2003 FIFA Confederations Cup
2003 in Colombian football
2003 in American soccer
2003 in Cameroonian football
2003 in New Zealand association football
June 2003 sports events in France
2003 in association football